UnPAY is a one-stop aggregation payment platform. It made its official launch in Singapore in April 2018.

Background
UnPAY aims to solve the fragmented payment channels faced by merchants today. This is done by providing an Application Programming Interface (API). Additionally, Merchants are offered a simplified one-stop portal or dashboard for their accounting needs. It was founded by Zhang Zhenghua. Headquartered in Singapore, UnPAY has offices in Hong Kong, Indonesia, India, New Zealand and the United Kingdom. In October 2018, UnPAY and the Tencent Research Institute jointly published the first of a series of papers on the payment landscape focusing on Southeast Asia. This centred on the Singapore market, was developed to help Chinese payment companies looking to venture overseas, have a better understanding of the local regulations and policies.

Awards

November 2018
Fortune China Innovation Award at The Fortune Global Tech Forum. First convened in 2017, this event taps into the strength of two ongoing Fortune powerhouse conferences: the Fortune Global Forum and Brainstorm TECH conference, which for the past seventeen summers has brought together the smartest, most innovative people in tech, media, entertainment, and finance in Aspen, Colorado. The Fortune Global Tech Forum explored the innovation revolution unfolding in China. The 2018 theme is “Innovation in the Age of AI.”In addition to providing insights into fast-moving trends, through the second Annual Fortune China Innovation awards, a competition between high-potential start-up companies in a variety of fields, which culminated in the naming of the Fortune China Innovation Company of the year.

September 2018
ASEAN Payment Summit 2018. The ASEAN Payment Summit which is dedicated to the state of payment in ASEAN, is an ASEAN edition of The Annual Payment China Summit. Established in 2006, The Annual Payment China Summit is a highly anticipated event that aims to bring together industry experts and leaders in the payment industry.

July 2018
Fintech Influential Brand Award at 2018 China Finance Summit. This was based on the positive evaluation and feedback garnered from the public, as well as its influence in the industry.

January 2019 
Outstanding Cross-border e-Commerce Financial Services Enterprise Award by The Shenzhen Cross-border e-Commerce Association.

International Cooperation

November 2018
UnPAY and Zhejiang China Commodity City Group Co., Ltd., jointly announced that they have signed a  partnership agreement to develop the city of Yiwu into the leading cross-border financial centre in China.

UnPAY and the President of Lithuania, Dalia Grybauskaitė, met at The China-Lithuania Economic Cooperation Forum and the China-Lithuania Financial Science and Technology Cooperation. UnPAY founder and CEO Zhang Zhenghua, was invited as a representative from one of the world's leading fintech companies.

June 2018
UnPAY was the only e-payment business from China to be invited to the Dubai Smart City Innovation Conference. The three parties have also reached preliminary agreement on possible collaborations.

Certifications

July 2018
UnPAY attained the Payment Card Industry Data Security Standard Version 3.2 (PCI DSS) validation on 20 June.

References 

Chinese brands
Companies of Singapore
Financial services companies established in 2018
Online payments